Faridoon Sharipov (born 8 September 1994) is a Tajikistani professional football player who currently plays for Barki Tajik.

Career

Club
In January 2016, Sharipov signed for FC Istiklol from Regar-TadAZ. In August 2017, Sharipov terminated his contract with Istiklol by mutual consent, going on to sign for Barki Tajik.

International
Sharipov made his senior team debut on 8 October 2015 against Kyrgyzstan.

Career statistics

Club

International

Statistics accurate as of match played 9 November 2016

Honours

Club
 Istiklol
 Tajik League (1): 2016
 Tajik Cup (1): 2016
 Tajik Super Cup (1): 2016

References

External links
 
 

1994 births
Living people
Tajikistani footballers
Tajikistan international footballers
FC Istiklol players
Association football midfielders
Tajikistan youth international footballers